Lipaphis pseudobrassicae is an aphid of the family Aphididae. Its common name is turnip aphid. The aphid can feed on multiple Brassica species, including Brassica juncea, Brassica campestris, as well as wild hosts such as Rorippa indica. Aphids from crop plants are often heavier and grow faster.

References

Hemiptera of Australia
Macrosiphini
Insects described in 1914